Steve Crear is an Australian former professional rugby league footballer who played in the 1970s and 1980s. A Queensland state and Australian national representative back, he played his club football in the Brisbane Rugby League for Western Suburbs and Redcliffe, as well as elsewhere in Queensland for Rockhampton and Gatton.

In 1971 Crear was first selected to represent Queensland against New South Wales.

Crear played at centre for Western Suburbs in the 1976 Brisbane Rugby League Premiership's Grand final victory over Eastern Suburbs.

Crear was selected for the Australian team's 1977 Rugby League World Cup campaign, becoming Kangaroo No. 500, but did not play any games. Also in 1977 Crear received the Western Suburbs club's Annual Old Boys Best & Fairest Award.

In 1981 Crear captained the Central Queensland team in the Datsun Country Championships.

In 2008, the centenary year of rugby league in Australia, Crear was named at five-eighth of Queensland Rugby League Central Division's team of the century.

References

Australia national rugby league team players
Queensland rugby league team players
Wests Panthers players
Redcliffe Dolphins players
Australian rugby league players
Rugby league five-eighths
Rugby league centres
Rugby league wingers
Year of birth missing (living people)